Scene of the Crime (also known by the title Ladykiller) is a 1996 American independent erotic thriller/mystery/suspense film.

Synopsis
Over a year after a chase to catch a serial slayer dubbed the 'LADYKILLER' ended in the death of his old partner, police officer Lt. Jack 'Jigsaw' Lasky sees a chance to redeem himself when another serial killer, 'The Piggy Bank Murderer', starts preying on female students at a local campus. He slasheds his victims' throats with a switchblade before stuffing loose change into their mouths, leaving behind the words "She Needed The Money" wherever he goes. Jack's search leads to a number one suspect in the form of Richard Darling, an out-of-work actor drawn to the case for reasons unknown... just as he is drawn to Jack's art student daughter, Jennifer who is studying at the same college where these murders are occurring. As Jack finds himself becoming partnered with Richard who continues always being never far away from when the next homicide occurs. Jack searches to uncover this killer before he continues his killing spree with Jennifer.

Cast

External links

1996 films
1996 crime drama films
American independent films
American crime drama films
1996 drama films
Films directed by Terence H. Winkless
1990s English-language films
1990s American films
1996 independent films